This article presents a list of the historical events and publications of Australian literature during 2005.

Events
Morag Fraser is appointed as a judge of the Miles Franklin Award, following the resignation of three judges in late 2004
Murray Bail is accused of plagiarism over several passages in his novel Eucalyptus.  Bail later accepts the breach and intends adding an acknowledgment in future editions
The Victorian town of Shepparton unveils a statue of Joseph Furphy, author of Such is Life
Collins Booksellers, Australia's third largest national bookseller, goes into voluntary administration

Major publications

Literary fiction

 Diane Armstrong – Winter Journey
 Anne Bartlett – Knitting
 Geraldine Brooks – March
 Brian Castro – The Garden Book
 J.M. Coetzee – Slow Man
 Gregory Day – The Patron Saint of Eels
 Robert Drewe – Grace
 Arabella Edge – The God of Spring
 Delia Falconer – The Lost Thoughts of Soldiers
 Kate Grenville – The Secret River
 Sonya Hartnett – Surrender
 Wendy James – Out of the Silence
 Nicholas Jose – Original Face
 Stephen Lacey – Sandstone
 Steven Lang – An Accidental Terrorist
 Carolyn Leach-Paholski – The Grasshopper Shoe
Andrew McCann – Subtopia
 Roger McDonald – The Ballad of Desmond Kale
 Alex Miller – Prochownik's Dream
 Joanna Murray-Smith – Sunshine
 Eva Sallis – The Marsh Birds
 Elizabeth Stead – The Book of Tides
 Carrie Tiffany – Everyman's Rules for Scientific Living
 Ian Townsend – Affection
 Christos Tsiolkas – Dead Europe
 Brenda Walker – The Wing of Night
 Tim Winton – The Turning

Children's and Young Adult fiction

 Randa Abdel-Fattah – Does My Head Look Big in This?
 Isobelle Carmody – Alyzon Whitestarr
 Kate Constable – The Tenth Power
 Gary Crew – The Lace Maker's Daughter
 Mem Fox – Hunwick's Egg
 Morris Gleitzman – Once
 Kerry Greenwood – The Rat and the Raven
 Sonya Hartnett – Surrender
 Barry Jonsberg – It's Not All About You, Calma!
 Justine Larbalestier – Magic or Madness
 Victor Kelleher – Dogboy
 Mardi McConnochie – Fivestar
 Garth Nix – Drowned Wednesday
 Penni Russon – Breathe
 Scott Westerfeld
 Pretties
 Touching Darkness
 Uglies
 Markus Zusak – The Book Thief

Crime

 Robert G. Barrett – Crime Scene Cessnock
 John Birmingham – Designated Targets: World War 2.2
 Peter Corris – Saving Billie
 Colin Cotterill – Thirty-Three Teeth
 Michelle de Kretser – The Hamilton Case
 Garry Disher – Snapshot
 Greg Flynn – The Berlin Cross
 Robert Gott – A Thing of Blood
 Kerry Greenwood – Death by Water 
 Gabrielle Lord – Dirty Weekend 
 P. D. Martin – Body Count
 Chris Nyst – Crook as Rookwood 
 Leigh Redhead – Rubdown
 Matthew Reilly – Seven Ancient Wonders
 Michael Robotham – Lost
Heather Rose – The Butterfly Man
 Steve J. Spears – Innocent Murder
 Peter Temple – The Broken Shore

Romance

Lilian Darcy – The Father Factor
 Marion Lennox – Bride by Accident

Science fiction and fantasy

 K. A. Bedford – Eclipse
 Damien Broderick – Godplayers
 Cecilia Dart-Thornton – The Well of Tears
 Marianne de Pierres – Crash Deluxe
 Sara Douglass – Darkwitch Rising
 Kate Forsyth – The Shining City
 Catherine Jinks – Evil Genius
 Juliet Marillier – The Blade of Fortriu
 Sean Williams
 Ascent
 The Blood Debt
 The Hanging Mountains

Drama

 Chris Aronsten – Human Resources
 Jane Brodie – A Single Act
 Catherine Lazaroo – Asylum

Poetry

 Alan Gould – The Past Completes Me: Selected Poems 1973-2003
 John Kinsella – The New Arcadia
 Jennifer Maiden – Friendly Fire
 Jaya Savige – Latecomers

Non-fiction

R.J.B. Bosworth – Mussolini's Italy: Life Under the Dictatorship 1915-1945
Richard Broome – Aboriginal Victorians: A History Since 1800
 Helen Ennis – Margaret Michaelis: Love, Loss and Photography
 Pamela Freeman – The Black Dress: Mary MacKillop's Early Years
 Tom Keneally – A Commonwealth of Thieves: The Improbable Birth of Australia
 Maria Nugent – Botany Bay: Where Histories Meet

Biographies

 John Baxter – We'll Always Have Paris: Sex and Love in the City of Light
 Richie Benaud – My Spin on Cricket
 Eric Campbell – Absurdistan: A Bumpy Ride Through Some of the World's Scariest, Weirdest Places
 Maryanne Convoy – Morris West: Literary Maverick
 Peter C. Doherty – The Beginner's Guide to Winning the Nobel Prize: A Life in Science
 Graham Freudenberg – A Figure of Speech: A Political Memoir
 Gavin Fry – Albert Tucker
 Aneurin Hughes – Billy Hughes: Prime Minister and Controversial Founding Father of the Australian Labor Party
 Sandy McCutcheon – The Magician's Son
 William McInnes – A Man's Got to Have a Hobby: Long Summers with My Dad
 Brenda Niall – Judy Cassab: A Portrait
 Barry Pearce – Jeffrey Smart
 Jacob G. Rosenberg – East of Time
 Mandy Sayer – Velocity
 Craig Sherborne – Hoi Polloi
 Steve Waugh – Out of My Comfort Zone
 Elisabeth Wynhausen – Dirt Cheap: Life at the Wrong End of the Job Market

Awards and honours

Lifetime achievement

Fiction

International

National

Children and Young Adult

National

Crime and Mystery

National

Science Fiction

Non-Fiction

Poetry

Drama

Deaths

 11 April – John Brosnan, sf and cinema writer (born 1947)
 10 May – Percy Trezise, children's writer (born 1923)
 29 August – Margaret Scott, poet and novelist (born 1934)
 8 September – Donald Horne, social and political commentator (born 1921)
 14 October – Barney Roberts, poet and short story writer (born 1920)
 1 November – 
 Jenny Boult, poet (born 1951)
 Michael Thwaites, poet (born 1915)
 24 December – Bill Scott, poet and children's writer (born 1922)

See also
 2005 in Australia
 2005 in literature
 2005 in poetry
 List of years in literature
 List of years in Australian literature
 List of Australian literary awards

References

Note: all references relating to awards can, or should be, found on the relevant award's page.

Literature
Australian literature by year
21st-century Australian literature
2005 in literature